Sàbat Hill, Livingston Island  
 Sabazios Glacier, Sentinel Range
 Sabin Point, Nelson Island
 Sadala Point, Robert Island 
 Saedinenie Snowfield, Livingston Island
 Saffar Island, Elephant Island 
 Sagita Island, Astrolabe Island
 Sakar Peak, Livingston Island  
 Salash Nunatak, Greenwich Island 
 Saldobisa Cove, Trinity Island 
 Samodiva Glacier, Davis Coast  
 Samokov Knoll, Livingston Island 
 Samotino Point, Nordenskjöld Coast 
 Samuel Point, Livingston Island  
 San Stefano Peak, Rugged Island  
 Sandanski Point, Livingston Island  
 Sandilh Point, Oscar II Coast
 Saparevo Glacier, Smith Island 
 Mount Sara Teodora, Oscar II Coast 
 Mount Sarnegor, Brabant Island
 Satovcha Peak, Alexander Island
 Mount Schuyler, Trinity Peninsula  
 Sea Lion Glacier, Livingston Island  
 Sea Lion Tarn, Livingston Island  
 Sekirna Spur, Oscar II Coast
 Semela Ridge, Loubet Coast
 Senokos Nunatak, Trinity Peninsula  
 Serdica Peak, Livingston Island 
 Sestrimo Glacier, Trinity Peninsula  
 Sevar Point, Livingston Island  
 Sevlievski Peak, Smith Island  
 Sevtopolis Peak, Greenwich Island  
 Seydol Crag, Trinity Peninsula 
 Sexaginta Prista Bay, Oscar II Coast 
 Shabla Knoll, Livingston Island
 Shapkarev Buttress, Fallières Coast  
 Sherba Ridge, Loubet Coast
 Sheynovo Peak, Brabant Island
 Shipka Saddle, Livingston Island  
 Shipka Valley, Livingston Island  
 Shipot Point, Robert Island
 Shishman Peak, Livingston Island  
 Shopski Cove, Greenwich Island
 Shterna Glacier, Liège Island  
 Shumen Peak, Livingston Island  
 Shut Island, Wilhelm Archipelago
 Sigmen Glacier, Liège Island  
 Sigritsa Point, Livingston Island
 Sikera Valley, Sentinel Range  
 Silistra Knoll, Livingston Island  
 Silyanov Peak, Sentinel Range
 Simeon Peak, Livingston Island  
 Simeonov Island, South Orkney Islands
 Simitli Point, Rugged Island  
 Simms Rock, Livingston Island
 Sindel Point, Livingston Island  
 Sinemorets Hill, Livingston Island  
 Siniger Nunatak, Trinity Peninsula 
 Sinion Glacier, Nordenskjöld Coast 
 Sinitovo Gap, Danco Coast
 Sintika Cove, Elephant Island
 Sipey Bluff, Sentinel Range  
 Siren Lake, Livingston Island
 Sirma Glacier, Sentinel Range
 Sisson Rock, Livingston Island
 Sitalk Peak, Livingston Island 
 Skafida Peak, Sentinel Range 
 Skaidava Bay, Alexander Island
 Skakavitsa Peak, Trinity Peninsula
 Skaklya Glacier, Sentinel Range
 Skalina Point, Smith Island  
 Skamni Saddle, Sentinel Range
 Skaplizo Glacier, Clarence Island
 Skaptopara Cove, Greenwich Island  
 Skoba Island, Wilhelm Archipelago
 Skomlya Hill, Trinity Peninsula  
 Skoparnik Bluff, Trinity Peninsula  
 Škorpil Glacier, Loubet Coast  
 Skravena Cove, Livingston Island  
 Skrino Rocks, Robert Island  
 Sladun Peninsula, Danco Coast
 Slanchev Bryag Cove, South Orkney Islands
 Slatina Peak, Smith Island  
 Slav Point, Oscar II Coast
 Slaveykov Peak, Smith Island  
 Slavotin Point, Nelson Island 
 Slavyanka Beach, Elephant Island 
 Sliven Peak, Livingston Island  
 Slomer Cove, Trinity Peninsula  
 Smilets Point, Nelson Island
 Smilyan Bastion, Loubet Coast
 Smin Peak, Trinity Peninsula 
 Smirnenski Point, Robert Island
 Smith Cove, Clarence Island  
 Smochevo Cove, Low Island
 Smokinya Cove, Trinity Peninsula  
 Smolensk Strait, South Shetland Islands
 Smolyan Point, Livingston Island 
 Smyadovo Cove, Rugged Island  
 Snegotin Ridge, Trinity Peninsula 
 Snellius Glacier, Elephant Island
 Soatris Island, Brabant Island
 Sofia Peak, Livingston Island
 Sofia University Mountains, Alexander Island
 Sokol Point, Graham Coast  
 Solari Bay, Nordenskjöld Coast
 Solnik Point, Low Island  
 Solun Glacier, Loubet Coast  
 Somovit Point, Robert Island 
 Sonketa Ridge, Danco Coast 
 Sopot Ice Piedmont, Livingston Island  
 Sostra Heights, Sentinel Range
 Soyka Saddle, Clarence Island
 Sozopol Gap, Livingston Island  
 Spanish Knoll, Livingston Island  
 Spanish Point, Livingston Island  
 Sparadok Point, Livingston Island  
 Spartacus Peak, Livingston Island
 Spatnik Island, Wilhelm Archipelago
 Spoluka Point, Nordenskjöld Coast
 Sprey Island, Wilhelm Archipelago
 Sratsimir Hill, Davis Coast  
 Srebarna Glacier, Livingston Island 
 Sredets Point, Smith Island 
 Srednogorie Heights, Trinity Peninsula  
 Sredorek Peak, Davis Coast  
 Srem Gap, Trinity Peninsula
 St. Angelariy Peak, Oscar II Coast  
 St. Boris Peak, Livingston Island  
 St. Brigid Island, Biscoe Islands
 St. Christopher Island, Biscoe Islands
 St. Cyril Peak, Livingston Island  
 St. Evtimiy Crag, Livingston Island 
 St. Gorazd Peak, Oscar II Coast 
 St. Isidore Island, Biscoe Islands
 St. Ivan Rilski Col, Livingston Island  
 St. Kiprian Peak, Greenwich Island  
 St. Kliment Ohridski Base, Livingston Island  
 St. Methodius Peak, Livingston Island  
 St. Naum Peak, Livingston Island 
 St. Nicholas Cove, South Orkney Islands
 St. Sava Peak, Oscar II Coast 
 St. Sofroniy Knoll, Snow Island
 St. Theodosius Nunatak, Alexander Island  
 Stambolov Crag, Livingston Island 
 Stancheva Peak, Foyn Coast
 Stargel Peak, Oscar II Coast 
 Starmen Point, Graham Coast
 Starosel Gate, Livingston Island 
 Stavertsi Ridge, Brabant Island
 Stefan Karadzha Peak, Graham Coast
 Stego Island, Wilhelm Archipelago
 Stevrek Ridge, Oscar II Coast 
 Stikal Peak, Sentinel Range
 Stob Glacier, Oscar II Coast
 Stolnik Peak, Sentinel Range 
 Storgozia Nunatak, Nordenskjöld Coast 
 Stoyanov Cove, Livingston Island
 Stoykite Buttress, Nordenskjöld Coast 
 Strahil Peak, Sentinel Range 
 Strandzha Glacier, Livingston Island
 Strelcha Spur, Graham Coast 
 Stresher Peninsula, Graham Coast
 Stribog Mountains, Brabant Island
 Strinava Glacier, Sentinel Range 
 Struma Glacier, Livingston Island 
 Stryama Peak, Alexander Island 
 Stubel Hill, Trinity Peninsula  
 Studena Point, Anvers Island
 Suhache Rock, Robert Island  
 Suhindol Point, Smith Island  
 Sumer Passage, Liège Island
 Suregetes Cove, Krogh Island
 Sursuvul Point, Davis Coast
 Survakari Nunatak, Trinity Peninsula  
 Svetlya Peak, Oscar II Coast
 Svetovrachene Glacier, Brabant Island
 Svetulka Island, Robert Island
 Svilengrad Peninsula, Davis Coast
 Svishtov Cove, Livingston Island  
 Svoge Knoll, Livingston Island

See also 
 Bulgarian toponyms in Antarctica

External links 
 Bulgarian Antarctic Gazetteer
 SCAR Composite Gazetteer of Antarctica
 Antarctic Digital Database (ADD). Scale 1:250000 topographic map of Antarctica with place-name search.
 L. Ivanov. Bulgarian toponymic presence in Antarctica. Polar Week at the National Museum of Natural History in Sofia, 2–6 December 2019

Bibliography 
 J. Stewart. Antarctica: An Encyclopedia. Jefferson, N.C. and London: McFarland, 2011. 1771 pp.  
 L. Ivanov. Bulgarian Names in Antarctica. Sofia: Manfred Wörner Foundation, 2021. Second edition. 539 pp.  (in Bulgarian)
 G. Bakardzhieva. Bulgarian toponyms in Antarctica. Paisiy Hilendarski University of Plovdiv: Research Papers. Vol. 56, Book 1, Part A, 2018 – Languages and Literature, pp. 104-119 (in Bulgarian)
 L. Ivanov and N. Ivanova. Bulgarian names. In: The World of Antarctica. Generis Publishing, 2022. pp. 114-115. 

Antarctica
 
Bulgarian toponyms in Antarctica
Names of places in Antarctica